Raymond Saharath Persi (born February 17, 1975) is an American animator, director, screenwriter, producer, storyboard artist and voice actor. He has directed many episodes of The Simpsons, including "Mobile Homer", "The Girl Who Slept Too Little", "The Monkey Suit", "Little Big Girl", "24 Minutes", "Love, Springfieldian Style" and the Emmy Award-winning "The Seemingly Never-Ending Story". Persi went on to work as a sequence director for The Simpsons Movie (2007).

Outside of his Simpsons work, Persi co-directed Squirrel Nut Zippers' "Ghost of Stephen Foster" music video, from the album Perennial Favorites (Mammoth Records). The video won the "Best Animated Music Video" award at the 1999 Vancouver Animation Festival and was nominated for the Annie Award for Best Animated Short Subject. Raymond also created the character and performance "RayRay".

In 2010, Persi moved from Film Roman to Walt Disney Animation Studios where he worked extensively on Academy Award nominee Wreck-It Ralph (2012). In addition to serving as storyboard artist, he had a prominent acting role in the film as Gene, leader of the Nicelanders whom Wreck-It Ralph is programmed to antagonize. Persi also voices the Zombie from The House of the Dead in a scene where Ralph joins other video game villains at a support group meeting.

Persi has become a mainstay with Disney, providing additional voices and storyboard work for Frozen (2013), as well as the voice of Flash the Sloth and Officer Higgins in Zootopia (2016).

Persi is part-Thai on his mother's side. Saharath, Persi's middle name, is used in the credits for "Love, Springfieldian Style".

Filmography
Wreck-It Ralph (2012) – Voice of Gene and Zombie
Get a Horse! (2013) – Voice of Pete's Car Horn
Frozen (2013) – Additional Voices
Zootopia (2016) – Voice of Flash and Officer Higgins
Inner Workings (2016) – Voice of Stomach and Monk
Ralph Breaks the Internet (2018) – Voice of Gene
Santa's Little Helpers (2019) – Voice of Head Elf
Minions: The Rise of Gru (2022) - Voice of Birthday Boy

Simpsons episodes directed by Persi

Season 16
Mobile Homer

Season 17
The Girl Who Slept Too Little
The Seemingly Never-Ending Story
The Monkey Suit

Season 18
Little Big Girl
24 Minutes

Season 19
Love, Springfieldian Style

Season 20
Lost Verizon 
Four Great Women and a Manicure

Season 21
The Color Yellow

Accolades

References

External links 
 

Living people
1975 births
American television directors
Television producers from California
American animated film directors
American animated film producers
American animators
American puppeteers
American storyboard artists
American male voice actors
American film producers
Film directors from Los Angeles
Walt Disney Animation Studios people
American film directors of Thai descent